The 1884 Brooklyn Atlantics season was a season in American baseball. It was the first season in the American Association for the team, and they finished the year in ninth place.

The Brooklyn baseball team had played as the Brooklyn Grays in the Interstate Association in 1883, where they won the championship. In 1884, Charles Byrne moved the team into the American Association, renaming them the Atlantics in tribute to the old National Association Brooklyn Atlantics team.

Regular season

Season standings

Record vs. opponents

Roster

Player stats

Batting

Starters by position
Note: Pos = Position; G = Games played; AB = At bats; R = Runs scored; H = Hits; Avg. = Batting average; HR = Home runs

Other batters
Note: G = Games played; AB = At bats; R = Runs scored; H = Hits; Avg. = Batting average; HR = Home runs

Pitching

Starting pitchers
Note: G = Games pitched; GS = Games started; CG = Complete games; IP = Innings pitched; W = Wins; L = Losses; ERA = Earned run average; BB = Walks allowed; SO = Strikeouts

Relief pitchers
Note: G = Games pitched; W = Wins; L = Losses; SV = Saves; ERA = Earned run average; SO = Strikeouts

External links 
Baseball-Reference season page
Baseball Almanac season page
Acme Dodgers page 
Retrosheet

Brooklyn Atlantics season
Los Angeles Dodgers seasons
Brooklyn
19th century in Brooklyn
Park Slope